Elsa Mandelstamm Gidoni (March 12, 1901 – April 19, 1978) was a German-American architect and interior designer.

Early life
Gidoni was born Elsa Mandelstamm in Riga, Latvia, into the Lithuanian-Jewish family. Her father Fayvush (Pavel) Mandelstamm was a physician. She studied at the Imperial Academy of Arts in St. Petersburg from 1916-1917 and at the Technical University in Berlin in the mid-1920s. She then operated her own interior design firm from 1929 to 1933.

In 1933, after Adolf Hitler became Chancellor, Gidoni left Berlin and settled in Tel Aviv. There, she designed an economics school and worked on various projects such as planning the Swedish Pavilion at the Levant-Fair and the Café Galina. Much of Gidoni's work was of the International Style, an architecture style that became popular after World War I and is characterized by the use of industrial materials, lack of color, and flat surfaces. In 1938, she left Tel-Aviv due to increasing conflict within the political landscape, and moved to New York where she worked as an interior designer for Heimer & Wagner before eventually finding work as a project designer at the architectural firm of Kahn & Jacobs.

She became a member of the American Institute of Architects (AIA) in 1943. In 1960, she was one of 260 women in the AIA and only one of 12 working in New York.

Her older sister was violinist Margarita Mandelstamm Selinsky. Her first husband was the art critic and writer Alexander Gidoni. She later married Alexis L. Gluckmann, an engineer. In April 1978, she died at the age of 77 at her home in Washington, DC.

Select works

 Swedish Pavilion at the Levant Fair with Genia Averbuch, Tel Aviv, 1934
 Apartment house, Tel Aviv, 1937
 General Motors Futurama pavilion, 1939 World's Fair
 Research Library, 23 West 26th Street, New York
 Hecht Co Department Store, Ballston, Virginia

Further reading
 Stratigakos, Despina. "Reconstructing a Lost History: Exiled Jewish Women Architects in America." in Aufbau (The Transatlantic Jewish Paper), Vol. LXVIII, No. 22, p. 14. October 31, 2002.
 
 Torre, Susana. Women in American Architecture: A Historic and Contemporary Perspective. New York: Whitney Library of Design, 1977.
 Gagnon, Lisa. "Women In Architecture Celebrated During Wikipedia Edit-a-thon". School of Architecture and Planning University at Buffalo. Retrieved 5 June 2017.
 Meyer-Maril, Edina. "Architects in Palestine: 1920-1948". Jewish Women's Archive. Retrieved 5 June 2017.
 German and Austrian Women Architects in Mandatory Palestine (English and German), Sigal Davidi

References

External links
Pioneering Women of American Architecture, Elsa Mandelstamm Gidoni
Café Galina at Levant Fair, Tel Aviv, 1934, designed by Elsa Gidoni and Genia Averbuch, Library of Congress Prints and Photographs Division Washington, D.C.
Apartment house, Tel Aviv, 1937, Library of Congress Prints and Photographs Division Washington, D.C.  
Research library, 23 West 26th Street, New York, Library of Congress Prints and Photographs Division Washington, D.C.
Architectural drawings for a department store ("Hecht Co."), Ballston, Virginia, Library of Congress Prints and Photographs Division Washington, D.C.

1901 births
1978 deaths
Architects from Riga
Jewish women
German women architects
American women architects
Technical University of Berlin alumni
Jewish emigrants from Nazi Germany to Mandatory Palestine
20th-century American women
20th-century American people
20th-century German women